Armida is an opera by Antonín Dvořák in four acts, set to a libretto by Jaroslav Vrchlický that was originally based on Torquato Tasso's epic La Gerusalemme liberata. Dvořák's opera was first performed at Prague's National Theatre on 25 March 1904; the score was published as opus 115 in 1941.

In terms of genre, Armida represents the culmination of Dvořák's experimentation with a Wagnerian style of opera composition, though much of the music belongs to Dvořák's own genre. Vrchlický's libretto parallels the one that Philippe Quinault wrote for Jean-Baptiste Lully in their opera of the same name.

Roles

Synopsis

In the Royal gardens of Damascus the call to prayer is heard. Ismen enters with news of the approaching Franks, but tries to dissuade the King from a confrontation: let him instead send his daughter (whose hand Ismen has been seeking) to sow dissention.  She balks, but changes her mind when Ismen uses his magic to show her the enemy camp, recognizing Rinald as the knight she has just dreamed of.

Armida arrives in the crusader's camp and meets Rinald, who brings her into the council where she tells a story of a usurping uncle having blinded the king and chased her into the desert.   Rinald cannot wait for the commander of an expedition to restore her kingdom to be chosen by lot and is caught leaving camp with her by the hermit Peter, but the lovers are aided in their escape by Ismen, driving a chariot pulled by dragons.

Rinald and Armida are entertained in her garden by sirens and fairies.  Ismen is disguised as an old man and tries to destroy the palace, but finding his powers no match for Armida's sorcery, he goes to Rinald's companions and claims to be a convert.   Glad of his help, they accept from him the Archangel Michael's diamond shield, which they use to bring Rinald out of the palace, which collapses as soon as Armida gives way to grief.

Rinald asks forgiveness for abandoning his comrades and his mission.  As the crusaders advance on Damascus the battle passes through the camp and Rinald kills Ismen and faces a black knight, who drops his sword when he curses Armida's name.   Only after stabbing her does he recognize her and baptise her as she dies in his arms.

References

Vocal score prepared by Karel Šolc, introduction by Otakar Šourek, Orbis (Prague) 1941.

External links
 Armida on a comprehensive Dvorak site

Operas by Antonín Dvořák
1904 operas
Operas
Operas set in the Levant
Operas based on works by Torquato Tasso
Czech-language operas